

pi

pib
pibaxizine (INN)
pibecarb (INN)
piberaline (INN)
pibutidine (INN)

pic-pid
picafibrate (INN)
picartamide (INN)
picenadol (INN)
picilorex (INN)
piclamilast (INN)
piclonidine (INN)
piclopastine (INN)
picloxydine (INN)
picobenzide (INN)
picodralazine (INN)
picolamine (INN)
piconol (INN)
picoperine (INN)
picoplatin (USAN)
picoprazole (INN)
picotrin (INN)
picumast (INN)
picumeterol (INN)
pidobenzone (INN)
pidolacetamol (INN)
pidolic acid (INN)
pidotimod (INN)

pif-pim
pifarnine (INN)
pifenate (INN)
pifexole (INN)
piflutixol (INN)
pifonakin (INN)
pifoxime (INN)
piketoprofen (INN)
pildralazine (INN)
Pilopine HS
pilsicainide (INN)
pimavanserin tartrate (USAN)
pimeclone (INN)
pimefylline (INN)
pimelautide (INN)
pimetacin (INN)
pimethixene (INN)
pimetine (INN)
pimetremide (INN)
pimilprost (INN)
piminodine (INN)
pimobendan (INN)
pimonidazole (INN)
pimozide (INN)

pin-pio
pinacidil (INN)
pinadoline (INN)
pinafide (INN)
pinaverium bromide (INN)
pinazepam (INN)
pincainide (INN)
Pindac
pindolol (INN)
pinolcaine (INN)
pinoxepin (INN)
pioglitazone (INN)

pip

pipa-pipe
pipacycline (INN)
pipamazine (INN)
pipamperone (INN)
pipazetate (INN)
pipebuzone (INN)
pipecuronium bromide (INN)
pipemidic acid (INN)
pipenzolate bromide (INN)
pipequaline (INN)
piperacetazine (INN)
piperacillin (INN)
piperamide (INN)
piperazine calcium edetate (INN)
piperidolate (INN)
piperocaine (INN)
piperoxan (INN)
piperylone (INN)
pipethanate (INN)

pipo-pipr
pipobroman (INN)
pipoctanone (INN)
pipofezine (INN)
piposulfan (INN)
pipotiazine (INN)
pipoxizine (INN)
pipoxolan (INN)
Pipracil
pipradimadol (INN)
pipradrol (INN)
pipramadol (INN)
pipratecol (INN)
piprinhydrinate (INN)
piprocurarium iodide (INN)
piprofurol (INN)

piq
piquindone (INN)
piquizil (INN)

pir

pira-pirf
piracetam (INN)
piragliatin (USAN)
pirandamine (INN)
pirarubicin (INN)
piraxelate (INN)
pirazmonam (INN)
pirazofurin (INN)
pirazolac (INN)
pirbenicillin (INN)
pirbuterol (INN)
pirdonium bromide (INN)
pirenoxine (INN)
pirenperone (INN)
pirenzepine (INN)
pirepolol (INN)
piretanide (INN)
pirfenidone (INN)

piri-pirn
piribedil (INN)
piridicillin (INN)
piridocaine (INN)
piridoxilate (INN)
piridronic acid (INN)
pirifibrate (INN)
pirinidazole (INN)
pirinixic acid (INN)
pirinixil (INN)
piriprost (INN)
piriqualone (INN)
pirisudanol (INN)
piritramide (INN)
piritrexim (INN)
pirlimycin (INN)
pirlindole (INN)
pirmagrel (INN)
pirmenol (INN)
pirnabin (INN)

piro-pirt
piroctone (INN)
pirodavir (INN)
pirodomast (INN)
pirogliride (INN)
piroheptine (INN)
Pirohexal-D (Hexal Australia)
pirolate (INN)
pirolazamide (INN)
piromidic acid (INN)
piroxantrone (INN)
piroxicam (INN)
piroxicillin (INN)
piroximone (INN)
pirozadil (INN)
pirprofen (INN)
pirquinozol (INN)
pirralkonium bromide (INN)
pirsidomine (INN)
pirtenidine (INN)

pit-piz
pitenodil (INN)
Pitocin
pitofenone (INN)
pitolisant (INN)
pitrakinra (INN)
Pitressin Tannate
pituxate (INN)
pivagabine (INN)
pivampicillin (INN)
pivenfrine (INN)
pivmecillinam (INN)
pivopril (INN)
pivoxazepam (INN)
pixantrone dimaleate (USAN)
pizotifen (INN)